Stuttgarter Hofbräu is a German brewery located in Stuttgart, Baden-Württemberg. It was established in 1872.  It is the traditional beer of the city Stuttgart and one of the three brands of beer served at Cannstatter Volksfest.

See also
 List of brewing companies in Germany

References

External links 
 Official website
 

1872 establishments in Germany
Breweries in Germany
Breweries in Baden-Württemberg
Manufacturing companies based in Stuttgart
19th-century establishments in Württemberg
Dr. Oetker